Zauli is an Italian surname. Notable people with the surname include:

Bruno Zauli (1902–1963), Italian sports official
Giuseppe Zauli (1763–1822), Italian painter and engraver
Lamberto Zauli (born 1971), Italian footballer and manager

Italian-language surnames